France participated in the Eurovision Song Contest 2004 with the song "À chaque pas" written by Ben "Jammin" Robbins, Steve Balsamo and Jonatan Cerrada. The song was performed by Jonatan Cerrada. The French broadcaster France Télévisions in collaboration with the television channel France 3 internally selected the French entry for the 2004 contest in Istanbul, Turkey. Jonatan Cerrada was officially announced by France 3 as the French entrant on 9 February 2004 and later "Laissez-moi le temps" was announced as the French entry on 11 February 2004. On 22 February 2004, France 3 announced that Cerrada would perform a new song at the Eurovision Song Contest and "À chaque pas" was presented to the public as the new contest entry during a live performance by Cerrada on 22 March 2004 during the France 3 programme Symphonic Show.

As a member of the "Big Four", France automatically qualified to compete in the final of the Eurovision Song Contest. Performing in position 4, France placed fifteenth out of the 24 participating countries with 40 points.

Background 

France first won the contest in 1958 with "Dors, mon amour" performed by André Claveau. In the 1960s, they won three times, with "Tom Pillibi" performed by Jacqueline Boyer in 1960, "Un premier amour" performed by Isabelle Aubret in 1962 and "Un jour, un enfant" performed by Frida Boccara, who won in 1969 in a four-way tie with the Netherlands, Spain and the United Kingdom. France's fifth victory came in 1977, when Marie Myriam won with the song "L'oiseau et l'enfant". France have also finished second four times, with Paule Desjardins in 1957, Catherine Ferry in 1976, Joëlle Ursull in 1990 and Amina in 1991, who lost out to Sweden's Carola in a tie-break. In the 21st century, France has had less success, only making the top ten two times, with Natasha St-Pier finishing fourth in 2001 and Sandrine François finishing fifth in 2002. In 2003, the nation finished in eighteenth place with the song "Monts et merveilles" performed by Louisa Baïleche.

The French national broadcaster, France Télévisions, broadcasts the event within France and delegates the selection of the nation's entry to the television channel France 3. The French broadcaster had used both national finals and internal selection to choose the French entry in the past. From 2001 to 2003, the broadcaster opted to internally select the French entry, a procedure that was continued in order to select the 2004 entry.

Before Eurovision

Internal selection 
France 3 announced in early 2004 that the French entry for the 2004 Eurovision Song Contest would be selected internally. On 9 February 2004, France 3 announced that the French entrant for the Eurovision Song Contest 2004 would be Belgian singer Jonatan Cerrada. Information that Cerrada would represent France at the Eurovision Song Contest 2004 was leaked on 24 January 2004 by French newspaper France Dimanche following his win at the first season of the singing competition Nouvelle Star.

Jonatan Cerrada's song "Laissez-moi le temps", written by Shayane, was presented to the public on 11 February 2004 during a concert which was held at the L'Olympia in Paris. On 22 February 2004, France 3 announced that Cerrada would be performing a new song at the Eurovision Song Contest after "Laissez-moi le temps" was deemed unsuitable for the contest. The replacement entry "À chaque pas", written by Ben "Jammin" Robbins, Steve Balsamo and Jonatan Cerrada and contains lyrics in a bilingual mix of French and Spanish, was previewed online on 10 March 2004 and formally presented to the public on 22 March 2004 during the France 3 programme Symphonic Show, hosted by Évelyne Thomas.

At Eurovision
It was announced that the competition's format would be expanded to include a semi-final in 2004. According to the rules, all nations with the exceptions of the host country, the "Big Four" (France, Germany, Spain and the United Kingdom) and the ten highest placed finishers in the 2003 contest are required to qualify from the semi-final in order to compete for the final; the top ten countries from the semi-final progress to the final. As a member of the "Big 4", France automatically qualified to compete in the final on 15 May 2004. France did not broadcast the semi-final on 12 May 2004 and therefore did not vote.

In France, the final was broadcast on France 3 with commentary by Laurent Ruquier and Elsa Fayer, as well as via radio on France Bleu with commentary by Jean-Luc Delarue. The French spokesperson, who announced the French votes during the final, was Alex Taylor.

Final 

Jonatan Cerrada took part in technical rehearsals on 9 and 10 May, followed by dress rehearsals on 14 and 15 May. During the running order draw for the semi-final and final on 23 March 2004, France was placed to perform in position 4 in the final, following the entry from Norway and before the entry from Serbia and Montenegro.

The French performance featured Jonatan Cerrada on stage dressed in a white suit and performing the song with a stilted dancer, Tatiana Seguin. The stage colours were predominantly white and two helium filled balloons, one on the arena ceiling and one on the big dome shaped stage, were displayed during the performance. The performance was directed by Kamel Ouali who based the idea of the act around The Little Prince novella. Jonatan Cerrada was also joined on stage by four backing vocalists: Elisabet Baile, Labila Mokedem, Caroline Pascaud and Michel Cerroni. France placed fifteenth in the final, scoring 40 points.

Voting 
Below is a breakdown of points awarded to France and awarded by France in the grand final of the contest. The nation awarded its 12 points to Turkey in the final of the contest.

References

2004
Countries in the Eurovision Song Contest 2004
Eurovision
Eurovision